The Residency, also called as the British Residency and Residency Complex, is a group of several buildings in a common precinct in the city of Lucknow, Uttar Pradesh, India. It served as the residence for the British Resident General who was a representative in the court of the Nawab. The Residency is located in the heart of the city, in the vicinity of other monuments like Shaheed Smarak, Tehri Kothi and High Court Building.

History 
Construction started during the rule of  Nawab Asaf-ud-Daulah  and ended during the rule of Nawab Saadat Ali Khan II, who was the fifth Nawab of the province of Awadh (British spelling Oudh). Construction took place between 1780 and 1800 AD. Between 1 July 1857 and 17 November 1857 the Residency was subject to the Siege of Lucknow, part of the Indian Rebellion of 1857. The Residency now exists as ruins.

Architecture 
The Residency has been maintained as it was at the time of the final relief, and the shattered walls are still scarred by cannon shot. Ever since Indian Independence, little has changed. The ruined building is now surrounded by lawns and flowerbeds and serves as a tourist attraction. The cemetery at the nearby ruined church has the graves of 2,000 men, women and children, including that of Sir Henry Montgomery Lawrence who died during the siege.

There is a weathered epitaph near the grave of Sir Henry that reads "Here lies the son of Empire who tried to do his duty" while another nearby grave reads "Do not weep my children, for I am not dead, but am sleeping here." A light and sound show to display the history of the Residency is also played each evening.

References

External links 

Buildings and structures in Lucknow
India–United Kingdom relations
Ruins in India
Residencies of British India
1780 establishments in India